Tamás Révész is a Hungarian American photographer. He is head of photojournalism at BKF University of Applied Sciences (Budapest, Hungary).

Révész was born in Budapest, Hungary in 1946.

His critically acclaimed photography exhibition, "New York", was endorsed by the New York City Sister City Program.

Bibliography
His most recent published book is New York.

References

External links
Tamas Revesz Photography Portfolio Site

1946 births
Living people
American photographers
Hungarian emigrants to the United States